Konstantinos Balogiannis (born 8 February 1999) is a Greek professional footballer who plays as a midfielder for Super League club OFI.

Honours

PAOK
Greek Cup: 2018–19

References

External links 
Career Stats at Eurosport

1999 births
Living people
Greek footballers
Greece under-21 international footballers
Greece youth international footballers
Super League Greece players
PAOK FC players
Volos N.F.C. players
OFI Crete F.C. players
Association football midfielders
Footballers from Thessaloniki